Yadlin may refer to:

Aharon Yadlin (1926–2022), Israeli educator and politician
Amos Yadlin, IDF officer
Yadlin affair, political corruption scandal in Israel in the 1970s